Stefan Lindberg (born 1971 in Alingsås) is a Swedish writer, playwright and translator.

He made his book debut in 1999 with the short story collection Tusen nålar and has since published five more fiction books. In 2002, he published the novel Min terapi and in 2008 the collection of short stories I Gorans ögon. In 2014, he published the acclaimed novel Du vet väl om att du är värdefull and 2016 Nätterna på Mon Chéri, också, also a novel, which revolves around the so-called "33-åringen", the Palme murder and its investigation. The latest publication is the novel Splendor (2020), which was nominated for the August Prize in the category of best fiction book.

His dramatic works include Palme dör innan pau and Lavv. The latter has been set up several times, both in Sweden and abroad.

Bibliography

 1999 – Tusen nålar (translated, A thousand needles) - stories, Albert Bonniers Förlag
 2002 – Min terapi (translated, My therapy) - novel, Albert Bonniers Förlag
 2008 – I Gorans ögon (translated In Goran's eyes) - stories, Albert Bonniers Förlag
 2014 – Du vet väl om att du är värdefull (translated, You know very well that you are valuable) - novel Albert Bonniers Förlag) 
 2016 – Nätterna på Mon Chéri (translated, The nights at Mon Chéri) - novel, Albert Bonniers Förlag
 2020 – Splendor - novel, Albert Bonniers Förlag

Awards and nominations
 2014 – Ludvig Nordström Prize
 2014 – Ole and Ann-Marie Söderström's prize
 2014 – Nominated for Tidningen Vi's literature prize for Du vet väl om att du är värdefull
 2016 – Nominated for the Swedish Radio Novel Prize and Tidningen Vi's literature prize for Nätterna på Mon Chéri
 2020 – nominated for the August Prize and the Swedish Radio Novel Prize for Splendor

Other prose
 2008 – Slump (collective novel, published by Hotel Gothia Towers)
 2009 – Stjärnjägarna (short stories)
 2011 – The Bear Hunter (Tee fruit press)
 2014 – Till havet (Novellix)

Plays
 1993 – Trivsel
 1999 – Hej och välkomna (Östgötateatern)
 2000 – Världens smartaste tjej (Östgötateatern)
 2001 – Palme dör innan paus (Teater Bhopa)
 2001 – Pilot (Ung Scen Öst)
 2002 – Ja och Nej (Ung Scen Öst)
 2003 – Lavv (Ung Scen Öst)
 2004 – Huvudvärk med E (Ung Scen Öst)
 2005 – Mörkrets furste
 2007 – Det ryggradslösa djuret (radio play)
 2008 – Plocka potäter i kostym (Regionteater Väst)
 2010 – Prick och Fläck (dramatisering av Lotta Geffenblads böcker om Prick och Fläck, Teater 23)
 2010 – Det som en gång var fet jävla äng (Riksteatern, Länk)
 2013 – Texter till Gruppen och Herrarna (Gruppen)
 2013 – Barnen från yttre rymden (Länsteatern Blekinge/Kronoberg)

Anthologies
1999 – Författarbesök (Almqvist & Wiksell)
2004 – Unga Röster (Studentlitteratur)
2006 – Omkopplingar: avskrifter, listor, dokument, arkiv (Glänta)
2007 – Spela bollen jag är fri!: trettio europeiska författare om fotboll (Författarlandslagets förlag)
2008 – Fem pjäser för unga (Ung Scen Öst)
2010 – De Nios litterära kalender (Norstedts)
2011 – I den nordiska litteraturens tjänst (Pequod)
2012 – Länk (Gidlunds förlag)
2012 – MEN – mannens frigörelse från mannen (Weyler förlag)
2018 – Svenska noveller från Almqvist till Stoor (Albert Bonniers Förlag)
2019 – Tankar för dagen (Verbum)

Translations
 Motortown, Simon Stephens, Östgötateatern, 27 January 2007
 På stranden av världen, Simon Stephens (On the Shore of the Wide World) Simon Stephens, Göteborgs Stadsteater, 7 September 2007
 Examenstal till studenterna vid Kenyon College, 21 May 2005, David Foster Wallace, Glänta nr 4.08
 Harper Regan, Simon Stephens, Stockholms stadsteater 12 December 2009, Göteborgs stadsteater 3 April 2009
 Groupie, Arnold Wesker, Teater Nolby, 10 February 2011
 Kärlek och pengar (Love and Money), Dennis Kelly, 12 November 2010, Malmö Stadsteater
 Sångtexter till Helsingborgs Stadsteaters föreställning ”Allt som är ditt” 25 February 2011
 Jag älskar dig, mannen (I love you, Bro), Adam Cass, Riksteatern, 27 September 2011
 Vintertid, (Winterlong), Andrew Sheridan, Göteborgs Stadsteater, 25 November 2011
 Ett vanligt liv, (Det normale liv), Christian Lollike, Örebro Länsteater
 1984, av George Orwell i ny dramatisering av Robert Icke och Duncan Macmillan, Riksteatern, 2015
  Goda människor (Good people), David Lindsay-Abaire, Riksteatern, 2016
 Verkligheten (The Events), David Greig, Kulturhuset/Stadsteatern, 2017
 DNA, Dennis Kelly, Riksteatern/LÄNK, 2017

References

1971 births
Living people